Pinofranqueado, locally known as Pinofranqueáu, is a municipality located in Las Hurdes, province of Cáceres, Extremadura, Spain. According to the 2005 census (INE), the municipality has a population of 1651 inhabitants.

Royal visit
King Juan Carlos and Queen Sofia visited Pinofranqueado in April 1998, the first royal visity to Las Hurdes since 1922. In his speech the king praised the Hurdanos for having overcome the miseries and illnesses of the past.

Alquerías
The following alquerías (small settlements of a few houses) are within the municipal limits of Pinofranqueado (traditional name variants are in brackets):
Aldehuela (L’Aldegüela, pronounced "laldegwela")
Avellanar (L’Avellanal)
Castillo (El Castillu)
Las Erías
Horcajo (Horcaju)
Mesegal
El Moral
Muela (La Muela)
Ovejuela
Robledo (Robréu)
Sauceda (Saucea or Lasocea)

References

Las Hurdes
Municipalities in the Province of Cáceres